The 5000 metres speed skating event was part of the speed skating at the 1948 Winter Olympics programme. The competition was held on Sunday, 1 February 1948. Forty speed skaters from 14 nations competed.

Medalists

Records
These were the standing world and Olympic records (in minutes) prior to the 1948 Winter Olympics.

(*) The record was set in a high altitude venue (more than 1000 metres above sea level) and on naturally frozen ice.

Results

References

External links
Official Olympic Report
 

Speed skating at the 1948 Winter Olympics